Zigo is a brand of carrier bike designed by US company SOMA Cycle, Inc., located in South Orange, NJ. The product is convertible into a stroller. The forward-located position of the child carrier is similar to existing products in Europe.

The design of the Zigo Leader carrier bike was conceived by Michael Ehrenreich in 2004.

Models
 Zigo Leader X1 Carrier Bicycle - one child carrier bicycle.
 Zigo Leader X2 Carrier Bicycle - Two child carrier bicycle.

Other products
 Zigo Mango - Jogging stroller/bike trailer - incompatible with the Zigo® Cycle LeaderLink® System. Will NOT function as a front-mounted carrier bicycle.
 Zigo Cycle - a stand-alone 3- or 7-speed small wheel bicycle compatible with the Zigo ChildPod and Mango

Notes 
.

External links 
 
 Article from Bicycle Retailer & Industry News

Cycle manufacturers of the United States
Companies based in Essex County, New Jersey